Hei Ling Chau, formerly Hayling Chau, is an island of Hong Kong, located east of Silver Mine Bay and Chi Ma Wan of Lantau Island. Administratively, it is part of the Islands District.

Geography
Hei Ling Chau is located south of Peng Chau and north of Cheung Chau. Its companion, Sunshine Island, is at its northeast. The island is L-shaped with angle pointed northeast. Southwest water of the island is zoned as Hei Ling Chau Typhoon Shelter.

History
The island was originally named Nai Gu Island. It was settled at the end of the 19th century, and by 1951, there were 10 families numbering about 100 people on the island. It was designated as a leper colony in 1950 and the islanders were relocated to Tai Pak, Shap Long and Cheung Chau. The island was then renamed to Hei Ling Chau. At one time in the early 1960s, the leprous hospital reached a maximum of 540 patients. The colony was closed down in 1974, and remaining patients were relocated to the new Lai Chi Kok Hospital. The island was subsequently taken over by the Correctional Services Department.

Facilities

Rehabilitation
The Hei Ling Chau Addiction Treatment Centre occupies the north-western part of the island and students often get a chance to visit the island by joining preventive drug education programmes. The Centre Annex is located at the southeastern end of the Island.

Correctional Services
The Hei Ling Chau Correctional Institute is located on the eastern part of the island. The Lai Sun Correctional Institution is located on the northern side of the island. The Lai Sun Correctional Institution is the first Vocational Training Centre operated by the Correctional Services Department which aims to train inmates to develop useful and market-oriented vocational skills before re-integrated into society.

Religious Institutions
There are two Tin Hau Temples on the island. One was built in 1925 and was converted into a store room. The extant temple was built in 1985.

Proposed Projects
In 2004, the Hong Kong Government proposed to spend HK$12 billion to build a super jail on the island. The proposal met strong opposition from the general public and experts alike, and was shelved indefinitely.

In 2006, CLP explored the possibility of constructing a second commercial wind turbine installation on Hei Ling Chau Island in order to promote the use of renewable energy in Hong Kong.

Fauna
An endemic species, Dibamus bogadeki, commonly known as Bogadek's blind skink or Bogadek's legless lizard (Chinese: 鮑氏雙足蜥), was first discovered on the island by a Salesian priest and teacher, Father Anthony Bogadek, in whose honour the species is named. They live in soil or objects lying on the forest floor, the first live specimen discovered hiding under a mass of dead leaves and soil in a drain beside woodland. As a nocturnal and burrowing species it is practically blind and its eyes are covered by scales.

Transport
The ferry service from Peng Chau, operated by Hong Kong & Kowloon Ferry, continues on to Hei Ling Chau for some sailings, however a permit is required to disembark. , the fare for a single trip costs HK$17.5.

See also

 List of islands and peninsulas of Hong Kong
 Outlying Islands

References

External links

 Hei Ling Chau Correctional Institution
 Environmental concern of the super jail (WWF HK)
 Aerial image from Google Map
 Restricted Islands - TV programme by the Radio Television Hong Kong on Shek Kwu Chau and Hei Ling Chau
 Memories of Hong Kong's last leper colony

 
Islands of Hong Kong
Islands District
Populated places in Hong Kong